Paolo Beatrizzotti (born 3 November 1992 in Parma, Italy) is an Italian football player who is currently playing for Santarcangelo on loan from Parma.

Career
In July 2011, Beatrizzotti moved from Parma to Santarcangelo on a co-ownership deal, but full ownership returned to Parma in January 2012. In July 2012, he returned to Santarcangelo on a year's loan.

References

Living people
1992 births
Italian footballers
Parma Calcio 1913 players
Association football defenders